Thường Ðức Camp (also known as Thường Ðức Special Forces Camp) is a former U.S. Army and Army of the Republic of Vietnam (ARVN) base southwest of Da Nang in Quảng Nam Province, central Vietnam.

History
The 5th Special Forces Group Detachment A-109 first established a base here in March 1966 to monitor communist infiltration into the Da Nang vital area. The base was located near Route 14 approximately 40 km southwest of Da Nang.

On 28 September 1968 the PAVN attacked and temporarily overran the base. In response the U.S. Marines launched Operation Maui Peak from 6 to 19 October to relieve the siege. The forces involved included the 1st Battalion, 1st Marines, 2nd Battalion, 5th Marines, 3rd Battalion, 5th Marines, 2nd Battalion, 7th Marines and 3rd Battalion, 7th Marines and resulted in an estimated 353 PAVN killed for the loss of 28 Marines.

On 19 October 1970 the PAVN/VC attacked Thường Ðức but were repelled by ARVN forces with artillery, helicopter gunship and air support. The PAVN/VC withdrew after two days losing 163 killed and 20 captured.

In July 1974 Thường Ðức was attacked again by a Regiment of the PAVN 324th Division starting the Battle of Thượng Đức (1974). At the conclusion of the battle in November 1974 the PAVN occupied Thường Ðức.

Current use
The base is now partly a cemetery while the remainder has returned to jungle.

References

Installations of the United States Army in South Vietnam
Installations of the Army of the Republic of Vietnam
Military installations closed in the 1970s
Buildings and structures in Quảng Nam province